Buczkowski (feminine: Buczkowska; plural: Buczkowscy) is a Polish surname. The East Slavic language spelling of the surname is Buchkovsky.

The surname may refer to:
 Bob Buczkowski (1964–2018), American football player
 Iwona Buczkowska (born 1953), French-Polish architect
 Jen Buczkowski (born 1985), American soccer player
 Krzysztof Buczkowski (born 1986), Polish speedway rider
 Leonard Buczkowski (1900–1967), Polish film director
 Małgorzata Buczkowska (born 1976), Polish film and stage actress
 Monika Buczkowska (born 1992), Polish operatic soprano

See also
 
 
 Wola Buczkowska

Polish-language surnames